EFNMR may refer to:
 Earth's field NMR
 Electric field NMR